Ioannes II ("John II") may refer to:

 Patriarch John II of Constantinople (ruled 518–520)
 John II Komnenos (1087–1143), Byzantine emperor
 John II of Trebizond (c. 1262–1297)
 John II Doukas of Thessaly (ruled 1303–1318)
 John II Orsini (ruled 1323–1335)

See also
John II (disambiguation)
Ioannes I (disambiguation)